James Roy Paton (23 November 1882 – 25 April 1947) was an Australian politician.

He was born in Yabba, Victoria to grazier Archibald Paton and Ruth McMeekin. He attended Brighton Grammar School and then worked on the family property. On 30 April 1923 he married Isobel Mary McMeekin, with whom he had two children. He then moved to farm at Tallangatta, and from 1923 to 1947 served on Towong Shire Council, with two terms as president from 1929 to 1930 and from 1932 to 1933. He was the founding president of the Country Party's Tallangatta branch, and in 1932 won a by-election for the Victorian Legislative Assembly seat of Benambra. He was the party whip from 1943 to 1945, but died at Tallangatta in 1947.

References

1882 births
1947 deaths
People educated at Brighton Grammar School
National Party of Australia members of the Parliament of Victoria
Members of the Victorian Legislative Assembly
20th-century Australian politicians